Robert Henry Thompson was Dean of Ardfert from 1959 until 1966.

Thompson was educated at Trinity College, Dublin and  ordained in 1915. He began his ecclesiastical career with  curacies at Lorrha, Shoreditch and Templederry. He was the incumbent of Kilcolman, County Cork from 1932.

References

Alumni of Trinity College Dublin
Deans of Ardfert